Conor Gerard McLaughlin (born 26 July 1991) is a Northern Irish former footballer who played as a right back.

Club career

Preston North End
Born in Belfast, McLaughlin turned professional with Preston North End in January 2010. He made his début for Preston on 12 November 2010, in a 0–2 loss against Hull City. In December 2010, McLaughlin signed a contract extension, keeping him with Preston until 2013. He signed a two-month loan deal with Shrewsbury Town in March 2011.

He was transfer-listed by the club in May 2012.

Fleetwood Town
McLaughlin joined Fleetwood Town on 20 July 2012. He signed a new three-year contract with the club in June 2014. He scored his first goal – for any club – in the Football League in February 2015.

Millwall
McLaughlin signed for Millwall in July 2017. He scored his first goal for Millwall in a 2–2 draw with Queens Park Rangers on 12 September 2017.

Sunderland
After leaving Millwall he moved to Sunderland on a free transfer on 1 July 2019. On 25 May 2021 it was announced that he would leave Sunderland at the end of the season, following the expiry of his contract.

Return to Fleetwood Town and retirement
He re-signed for Fleetwood Town on a short-term deal in October 2021. On 14 January 2022, McLaughlin left Fleetwood for a second time following the expiration of his short-term deal, leaving the club as their all-time third highest EFL appearance maker.

On 14 April 2022, McLaughlin announced his retirement "due to injury".

International career
McLaughlin has represented Northern Ireland at youth international level.

He received his first call-up for the senior national team in October 2011, making his senior début later that month, in a 0–3 defeat against Italy on 11 October 2011.

McLaughlin started Northern Ireland's first game of Euro 2016 against Poland.

Personal life
Conor McLaughlin is the elder brother of Ryan McLaughlin; both have been capped by Northern Ireland.

Career statistics

Club

International

As of match played 9 November 2017. Northern Ireland score listed first, score column indicates score after each McLaughlin goal.

Honours
Sunderland
EFL Trophy: 2020–21

Individual
EFL Team of the Season: 2016–17

References

External links

1991 births
Living people
Association footballers from Northern Ireland
Northern Ireland youth international footballers
Northern Ireland under-21 international footballers
Northern Ireland international footballers
Association football defenders
Preston North End F.C. players
Shrewsbury Town F.C. players
Fleetwood Town F.C. players
Millwall F.C. players
Sunderland A.F.C. players
English Football League players
UEFA Euro 2016 players